In the history of cryptography, Typex (alternatively, Type X or TypeX) machines were British cipher machines used from 1937. It was an adaptation of the commercial German Enigma with a number of enhancements that greatly increased its security. The cipher machine (and its many revisions) was used until the mid-1950s when other more modern military encryption systems came into use.

Description
Like Enigma, Typex was a rotor machine. Typex came in a number of variations, but all contained five rotors, as opposed to three or four in the Enigma. Like the Enigma, the signal was sent through the rotors twice, using a "reflector" at the end of the rotor stack. On a Typex rotor, each electrical contact was doubled to improve reliability.

Of the five rotors, typically the first two were stationary. These provided additional enciphering without adding complexity to the rotor turning mechanisms. Their purpose was similar to the plugboard in the Enigmas, offering additional randomization that could be easily changed. Unlike Enigma's plugboard, however, the wiring of those two rotors could not be easily changed day-to-day. Plugboards were added to later versions of Typex.

The major improvement the Typex had over the standard Enigma was that the rotors in the machine contained multiple notches that would turn the neighbouring rotor. This eliminated an entire class of attacks on the system, whereas Enigma's fixed notches resulted in certain patterns appearing in the cyphertext that could be seen under certain circumstances.

Some Typex rotors came in two parts, where a slug containing the wiring was inserted into a metal casing. Different casings contained different numbers of notches around the rim, such as 5, 7 or 9 notches. Each slug could be inserted into a casing in two different ways by turning it over. In use, all the rotors of the machine would use casings with the same number of notches. Normally five slugs were chosen from a set of ten.

On some models, operators could achieve a speed of 20 words a minute, and the output ciphertext or plaintext was printed on paper tape. For some portable versions, such as the Mark III, a message was typed with the left hand while the right hand turned a handle.

Several Internet Typex articles say that only Vaseline was used to lubricate Typex machines and that no other lubricant was used. Vaseline was used to lubricate the rotor disc contacts. Without this there was a risk of arcing which would burn the insulation between the contacts.  For the rest of the machine two grades of oil (Spindle Oils 1 and 2) were used. Regular cleaning and maintenance was essential. 
In particular, the letters/figures cam-cluster balata discs had to be kept lubricated.

History and development
By the 1920s, the British Government was seeking a replacement for its book cipher systems, which had been shown to be insecure and which proved to be slow and awkward to use. In 1926, an inter-departmental committee was formed to consider whether they could be replaced with cipher machines. Over a period of several years and at large expense, the committee investigated a number of options but no proposal was decided upon. One suggestion was put forward by Wing Commander Oswyn G. W. G. Lywood to adapt the commercial Enigma by adding a printing unit but the committee decided against pursuing Lywood's proposal.

In August 1934, Lywood began work on a machine authorised by the RAF. Lywood worked with J. C. Coulson, Albert P. Lemmon, and Ernest W. Smith at Kidbrooke in Greenwich, with the printing unit provided by Creed & Company. The first prototype was delivered to the Air Ministry on 30 April 1935. In early 1937, around 30 Typex Mark I machines were supplied to the RAF. The machine was initially termed the "RAF Enigma with Type X attachments".

The design of its successor had begun by February 1937. In June 1938, Typex Mark II was demonstrated to the cipher-machine committee, who approved an order of 350 machines. The Mark II model was bulky, incorporating two printers: one for plaintext and one for ciphertext. After trials, the machine was adopted by the RAF, Army and other government departments. During World War II, a large number of Typex machines were manufactured by the tabulating machine manufacturer Powers-Samas.

Typex Mark III was a more portable variant, using the same drums as the Mark II machines powered by turning a handle (it was also possible to attach a motor drive). The maximum operating speed is around 60 letters a minute, significantly slower than the 300 achievable with the Mark II.

Typex Mark VI was another handle-operated variant, measuring  × ×, weighing  and consisting of over 700 components.

Plugboards for the reflector were added to the machine from November 1941.

For inter-Allied communications during World War II, the Combined Cipher Machine (CCM) was developed, used in the Royal Navy from November 1943. The CCM was implemented by making modifications to Typex and the United States ECM Mark II machine so that they would be compatible.

Typex Mark VIII was a Mark II fitted with a morse perforator.

Typex 22 (BID/08/2) and Typex 23 (BID/08/3) were late models, that incorporated plugboards for improved security. Mark 23 was a Mark 22 modified for use with the CCM. In New Zealand, Typex Mark II and Mark III were superseded by Mark 22 and Mark 23 on 1 January 1950. The Royal; Air Force used a combination of the Creed Teleprinter and Typex until 1960. This amalgamation allowed a single operator to use punch tape and printouts for both sending and receiving encrypted material.

Erskine (2002) estimates that around 12,000 Typex machines were built by the end of World War II.

Security and use
Less than a year into the war, the Germans could read all British military encryption other than Typex, which was used by the British armed forces and by Commonwealth countries including Australia, Canada and New Zealand. The Royal Navy decided to adopt the RAF Type X Mark II in 1940 after trials; eight stations already had Type X machines. Eventually over 600 machines would be required. New Zealand initially got two machines at a cost of £115 (GBP) each for Auckland and Wellington.

From 1943 the Americans and the British agreed upon a Combined Cipher Machine (CCM). The British Typex and American ECM Mark II could be adapted to become interoperable. While the British showed Typex to the Americans, the Americans never permitted the British to see the ECM, which was a more complex design. Instead, attachments were built for both that allowed them to read messages created on the other.

In 1944 the Admiralty decided to supply 2 CCM Mark III machines (the Typex Mark II with adaptors for the American CCM) for each "major" war vessel down to and including corvettes but not submarines; RNZN vessels were the Achilles, Arabis (then out of action), Arbutus, Gambia and Matua.

Although a British test cryptanalytic attack made considerable progress, the results were not as significant as against the Enigma, due to the increased complexity of the system and the low levels of traffic.

A Typex machine without rotors was captured by German forces at Dunkirk during the Battle of France and more than one German cryptanalytic section proposed attempting to crack Typex; however, the B-Dienst codebreaking organisation gave up on it after six weeks, when further time and personnel for such attempts were refused.

One German cryptanalyst stated that the Typex was more secure than the Enigma since it had seven rotors, therefore no major effort was made to crack Typex messages as they believed that even the Enigma's messages were unbreakable.

Although the Typex has been attributed as having good security, the historic record is much less clear. There was an ongoing investigation into Typex security that arose out of German POWs in North Africa claiming that Typex traffic was decipherable.

A brief excerpt from the report

<blockquote><poem>TOP SECRET U [ZIP/SAC/G.34]
THE POSSIBLE EXPLOITATION OF TYPEX BY THE GERMAN SIGINT SERVICES

The following is a summary of information so far received on German attempts to break into the British Typex machine, based on P/W interrogations carried out during and subsequent to the war. It is divided into (a) the North African interrogations, (b) information gathered after the end of the war, and (c) an attempt to sum up the evidence for and against the possibility of German successes.Apart from an unconfirmed report from an agent in France on 19 July 1942 to the effect that the GAF were using two British machines captured at DUNKIRK for passing their own traffic between BERLIN and GOLDAP, our evidence during the war was based on reports that OKH was exploiting Typex material left behind in TOBRUK in 1942.</poem></blockquote>

Typex machines continued in use long after World War II. The New Zealand military used TypeX machines until the early 1970s, disposing of its last machine in about 1973.

Advantages over Enigma
All the versions of the Typex had advantages over the German military versions of the Enigma machine. The German equivalent teleprinter machines in World War II (used by higher-level but not field units) were the Lorenz SZ 40/42 and Siemens and Halske T52 using Fish cyphers.

 Most versions of the Enigma required two operators to operate effectively—one operator to input text into the Enigma and the other to copy down the enciphered or deciphered characters—Typex required just one operator.
 Typex avoided operator copying errors, as the enciphered or deciphered text was automatically printed on paper tape.
 Unlike Enigma, Typex I machines were linked to teleprinters while Typex II machines could be if required.
 Enigma messages had to be written, enciphered, transmitted (by Morse), received, deciphered, and written again, while Typex messages were typed and automatically enciphered and transmitted all in one step, with the reverse also true.

See also
 Cryptanalysis of the Enigma
 Cryptanalysis of the Lorenz cipher
Mercury (Typex Mark X)—a Typex descendant used for on-line traffic.

Notes

References
 Martin Campbell-Kelly, ICL: A Business and Technical History, Oxford University Press, 1990.
 Dorothy Clarkson, "Cypher Machines: Maintenance and Restoration Spanning Sixty Years", Cryptologia, 27(3), July 2003, pp. 209–212.
 Cipher A. Deavours and Louis Kruh, "Machine Cryptography and Modern Cryptanalysis", Artech House, 1985, pp. 144–145; 148–150.
 Ralph Erskine, "The Admiralty and Cipher Machines During the Second World War: Not So Stupid after All". Journal of Intelligence History 2(2) (Winter 2002).
 Ralph Erskine, "The Development of Typex", The Enigma Bulletin'' 2 (1997): pp. 69–86
 Kruh and Deavours, "The Typex Cryptograph" Cryptologia 7(2), pp. 145–167, 1983
 Eric Morgon, "The History of Communications Security in New Zealand", Part 1 (PDF).Possibly related page as html

External links

 A series of photographs of a Typex Mk III
 Jerry Proc's page on Typex
 Typex graphical simulator for Microsoft Windows
 Virtual Typex online simulator
 Crypto Museum page on Typex

Cryptographic hardware
Rotor machines
World War II military equipment of the United Kingdom